Padang Jawa is a kampung and a suburb of Shah Alam, Selangor, Malaysia.

Transit station

Padang Jawa is served by the Padang Jawa Komuter station under the KTM Komuter .

Nearby facilities
The Selangor state head office of Road Transport Department Malaysia is located on Jalan Padang Jawa (Known for B number plate registration issuance).
The PUSPAKOM Padang Jawa inspection centre is located next to Road Transport Department Malaysia office.

References

Shah Alam
Towns in Selangor